Luitgard is a German female name.

Origin 

The name comes from Old High German and means "[female] guardian of the people"  (German: Beschützerin des Volks). This derives, in its older form, Liutgard, from liut which means "people" (Modern German: Leute), "member of a people", and gard which means "protection" or "guardianship", from which the German word Garten and the English word "garden" are also derived.

Name day 
Its name day is 16 October, the same date as that of the Blessed Luitgard of Wittichen.

Variants 
 Luitgart, Luitgardt, Lutgard, Lutgaarde, Lutgart, Liutgard, Liutgart, Liudgard

Notable bearers of the name 
 Luitgard (died 4 June 800), last of the five wives of Charlemagne
 Liutgard of Beutelsbach, benefactress of Hirsau Abbey and sister of Conrad I of  Württemberg
 Liutgard of Saxony (died 885), wife of the King of East Francia, Louis the Younger
 Liutgard of Saxony (died 953), daughter of the Emperor Otto I's first marriage, who married Duke Conrad of Lorraine in 947
 Lutgardis of Luxemburg (c. 955 – c. 1005), wife of Arnulf, Count of Holland
 Luitgard of Swabia (died 1146), daughter of Frederick II of Swabia and Agnes of Saarbrücken, married Conrad I of Meissen in 1119
 Luitgart (died after 1150), daughter of Count Frederick I of Zollern, nun in Zwiefalten
 Lutgard of Salzwedel (died 1152), wife of Eric III, King of Denmark
 Lutgard of Tongern (1182–1246), Flemish mystic
 Luitgard of Tübingen (born c. 1240; died 1309), Countess Palatine of Tübingen
 Liutgart of Tübingen, wife of Burkhard V (died 1318), Count of Nagold-Wildberg, House of Hohenberg
 Blessed Luitgard of Wittichen (1291–1348), German nun, mystic and founder of Wittichen Abbey

References 

Feminine given names